Maihar railway station  is a railway station serving Maihar town, in Satna district of Madhya Pradesh state of India. Maihar is A category station of West Central Railway Zone of Indian Railways.

Administration 

It is under Jabalpur railway division of West Central Railway Zone of Indian Railways.

Line 

It is located on Katni - Satna main line of the Indian Railways.

Structure 

It is located at 353 m above sea level and has three platforms.

Development 

As of 2016, electrified of existing double Broad Gauge railway line is in progress and at this station, 81 trains stops. Khajuraho Airport, is at distance of 111 kilo meters.

See also
 Satna district

References

External links

Jabalpur railway division
Railway stations in Satna district